Lichfield Rugby Union Football Club is a rugby union club based in the city of Lichfield, Staffordshire. The first XV currently play in Regional 1 Midlands, a fifth tier league in the English rugby union system, following their promotion from Midlands 1 West. It is one of the oldest rugby football clubs still in active in England, although the oldest in Staffordshire is Burton Rugby Union Football Club, which was founded in 1870. The club runs three senior teams, a veterans team, two women's teams and a youth section ranging from under sevens to colts and includes a women's under-18 team.

History 
Lichfield Rugby Union Football Club was founded in 1874 based at the cricket club ground and playing both association and rugby forms of the game. In 1890 the association football section broke away to form the City Football Club Lichfield Rugby Union Football Club was re-formed in 1925. It played on various sites for a time until a permanent ground was acquired in Boley Lane in 1961. The current ground, Cooke fields, was opened in 1985.

Honours
Staffordshire Senior Cup winners (13): 1979, 1982, 1984, 1985, 1986, 1987, 1990, 1991, 1997, 2011, 2013, 2014, 2016
Midlands 2 West (North) champions (2): 2005–06, 2009–10
Midlands Division 1 West champions: 2013–14, 2021–22

References

External links
 Official club site

English rugby union teams
Rugby clubs established in 1874
Rugby union in Staffordshire
Lichfield
1874 establishments in England